In Renaissance alchemy, alkahest was the theorized "universal solvent". It was supposed to be capable of dissolving any other substance, including gold, without altering or destroying its fundamental components. 

Among its philosophical and spiritual preoccupations, Hermeticism was more anciently concerned with the panacea, but (in the context of reformed understandings of human physiology) the emergent Latin alchemy associated with European humanism was itself transmuted into a new medical and pharmaceutical philosophy. The Swiss physician and alchemist Philippus Paracelsus (1493-1541), who gave his name to the early modern school of medical theory known as Paracelcism, first made mention of the alkahest as a chemical which could fortify the liver, and (in instances where the liver failed) could act as a substitute for its functions (see De Viribus Membrorum Spiritualium, Cap. VI, "De Cura Epatis", at p. 10). By reducing or dissolving substances into their fundamental virtues and properties, it was hoped to gain control of those invaluable medical healing properties (see also azoth), and for this reason the alkahest (also known as the ignis gehennae) was earnestly sought, and the reality (or otherwise) of its existence was debated among the alchemists and philosophers.

History 
Alkahest became very popular in the 17th and 18th centuries through J.B. van Helmont, after which it was taken less seriously over time. Its prevalence in the 17th and 18th centuries, despite its otherwise absurd and extreme qualities, was likely due to the popularity of alchemy at the time and the lack of an adequate alternative theory of chemistry. Those who followed and trained under Paracelsus did not think of the alkahest as van Helmont did, but slowly built upon the ideas posed by their teacher. Tobias Ludwig Kohlhans (1624-1705) suggested in his dissertation of the spleen, that alkahest could be found in the lymphatic vessels of animals. This was then contested and doubted by Helmont, Henry Oldenburg (later in 1661), and Goddard, who raised questions about the lymph's "sweetly acidic" quality, the necessity of a hypothetical universal solvent to explain the acidity in empty animal lymphatic vessels, its ability to be generated within the body, and how it differed from that of the other fluids or humours in the body. The German alchemist Johann Kunckel (1630-1703) and others in time began to see the alkahest as merely fantasy and wishful thinking. Ladislaus Reti, a 20th-century historian of science, investigated alchemical recipes involving alkahest and found that no chemical was sufficient in breaking down the wide variety of materials Helmont supposed. Reti points out that in such recipes, an alcohol solution of potassium hydroxide could have been used instead.

Etymology
There is no consensus on the origin and etymology of the word alkahest, as Paracelsus left no trace or history of the word. George Starkey argued it came from the german word al-gehest (all spirit). Johann Rudolph Glauber posed that it could have come from the words alhali est, the german word al gar heis, or Al zu hees, meaning "very hot". Cleidophorus Mystagogus in England argued for its root being of Belgian or High Dutch. Paracelsus believed that alkahest was, in fact, the philosopher's stone, whereas Henry Oldenburg in 1661 made experimental connections between the legendary alkahest, and the liquid discovered in the lymphatic vessels of animals introduced by Kohlhans. Boerhaave in his textbook Elementa Chymiae (1732), did not think Alkahest was the philosopher's stone but that it was in fact of greater importance and value than the stone.

Other names 
Helmont considered the alkahest to have never-ending reusability, calling it an "immortal". He also used the term "maccabean fire" because of its similarities to the "thick water" in the deuterocanonical Book of Maccabees in the Old Testament. Another name for the Alkahest termed by Helmont was ignis gehennae. Other names include Latex (or "clear water reduced to its minutest atoms"), and primum Ens Salum (or "salt exalted to its highest degree").

Structure and mechanism 
The theory of alkahest was conceived in terms of alchemy, Helmontian theories, and the physical theory of corpuscularianism. According to Helmont and Robert Boyle, the alkahest had a "microstructure", meaning it was composed of extremely small, homogeneous corpuscles. This structure allowed the alkahest's corpuscles to move between the corpuscles of all other materials and mechanically separate them without altering their base materials or itself, conforming with the idea that it was infinitely reuseable. 
It was these qualities which made the alkahest distinct from ordinary corrosives, which are altered by the substances they act upon and thus are not infinitely reusable.

Uses 
George Starkey and his mentor Helmont (by their report) used mercuric sulphide to dissolve gold, and informed Boyle about it in a series of letters. The alkahest, according to Starkey, was able to remove sulphur from the natural mercury leaving a quicksilver resistant to corrosion. Moreover, because of the credited power of alkahest to break down substances into their occult qualities, it was sought after for its potential to cure incurable diseases at the time. For example, the breaking down of Ludus could provide a cure for urinary calculi.

Recipe 
The recipe for the theorized alkahest was often kept secret, as many alchemical recipes were. There were many alchemists attempting to obtain the universal solvent, and thus many recipes, some later rejected by their creators, have been found.

Paracelsus 
Paracelsus's own recipe for alkahest was made of caustic lime, alcohol, and carbonate of potash; however, his recipe was not intended to be a "universal solvent".

Jan Baptist van Helmont 
Following Paracelsus, it was the chemist Jan Baptist van Helmont who expanded on the alkahest, believing it was a universal solvent. Helmont claimed that knowledge of the recipe was granted by God and was therefore known by few, and he had many dreams during which he believed he had been gifted the recipe, only to find them inadequate. Given the difficulty of obtaining alkahest, Helmont suggested the use of other, inferior substances that they believed were capable of similar tasks. Volatile salt of tartar, also known as pyrotartaric acid or glutaric acid, was considered both a substitute for alkahest and a component of alkahest. Helmont's writings also referred to a fourteenth century alchemical manuscript which discussed sal alkali, which may have been caustic potash or lye, that was capable of dissolving many substances and may have been an ingredient for Helmont's alkahest.

Seventeenth century alchemists 
During the seventeenth century, many alchemists were working on obtaining the alkahest, some being Johann Rudolf Glauber, George Starkey, Frederick Clod, Thomas Vaughan, Thomas Henshaw, Johann Brun, Robert Hamilton, Hugh Piatt, and Robert Child. Glauber believed that the alkahest was a class of substances, rather than one, particular substance. Glauber believed he had discovered alkahest after discovering that volatile niter (nitric acid) and fixed niter (potassium carbonate) were able to dissolve many substances. Starkey described alkahest as a circulated salt that is neither acid nor alkali. Moreover, Starkey believed that, because acid saline liquors are destroyed by alkalies and urinous spirits, they cannot be ingredients of the immortal alkahest. He believed instead that non-acidic substances could be ingredients of the alkahest, some of these suspected substances being urinous spirits, spirit of alkalies, and sulphureous vegetable spirits. In particular, Starkey believed that alkahest's secret ingredient laid within urine. Clodius believed that mercury could convert salts into "ponderous liquor", which he believed was needed to make the alkahest.

Issues with the concept
A potential problem involving alkahest is that, if it dissolves everything, then it cannot be placed into a container because it would dissolve the container. This problem was first posed by German alchemist Johann Kunckel. However, the alchemist Philalethes specified that alkahest dissolved only composed materials into their constituent, elemental parts; hence, a hypothetical container made of a pure element (say, lead) would not be dissolved by alkahest.

Modern usages of the term
The old remark "spit is the universal solvent" satirizes the idea, suggesting that instead of a solvent that would easily dissolve anything, the only "real" solvent to anything is a great deal of hard work. 

In modern times, water is sometimes called the universal solvent, because it can dissolve a large variety of substances, due to its chemical polarity and amphoterism.

Alkahest, Inc. is a biopharmaceutical subsidiary of Grifols which is developing products derived from blood plasma to reverse and inhibit aging.

References

Alchemical substances
Mythological substances